Balcılar is a town in the district of Taşkent, Konya Province, Turkey.

Geography 

Balcılar (former Alata) is in the rural area of Taşkent district which is a part of Konya Province. The population is 2,279 as of 2011

History 
The earliest settlers in the 16th century were Turkmens from the village of Alata (modern Erdemli district of Mersin Province) who named the village after their former home, Alata. In 1964, Alata was declared a township and renamed Balcılar, meaning beekeepers. Balcılar made news in 2008 when bottled gas in a girls’ dormitory building exploded, killing 16 students and two teachers.

Economy 
The main economic activities are beekeeping and agriculture. Apple is the most pronounced crop, followed by cherry and walnut.

References 

Populated places in Konya Province
Towns in Turkey
Taşkent District